"Nice 'N' Slow" is a 1988 single recorded by Freddie Jackson and written by Barry J. Eastmond and Jolyon Skinner.  

As the lead single from his third album, Don't Let Love Slip Away, it was Jackson's seventh number one on the Hot Black Singles chart, staying at the top spot for three weeks.  "Nice 'N' Slow" was the last of Jackson's releases to chart on the Hot 100, peaking at number sixty-one.

Chart history

See also
 List of number-one R&B singles of 1988 (U.S.)

References

1988 singles
Freddie Jackson songs
Songs written by Barry Eastmond
1988 songs
Songs written by Jolyon Skinner